The Royal Pharmaceutical Society of Great Britain (RPSGB) existed from its founding as the Pharmaceutical Society of Great Britain in 1841 until 2010. The word "Royal" was added to its name in 1988. It was the statutory regulatory and professional body for pharmacists and pharmacy technicians in England, Scotland and Wales. In September 2010, the regulatory powers of the Society were transferred to the newly formed General Pharmaceutical Council (GPhC). The RPSGB became the Royal Pharmaceutical Society (RPS) at that time and retained its professional leadership role; the "Great Britain" part of the name was dropped for day-to-day purposes.

Statutory role 
Before the establishment of the GPhC and the transfer of regulatory power, the primary objective of the RPSGB was to lead, regulate, develop and promote the pharmaceutical profession. All pharmacists in Great Britain had to be registered with the Society in order to practise, and the Society was unusual amongst healthcare regulators that it had its own inspectorate.

In latter years, in order to become a member of the Society an individual usually had to complete: 
 a MPharm or (if graduating before 2000) a BPharm or BSc (pharmacy) degree, 
 52 weeks of pre-registration training and
 pass a registration examination. 

This gave them the right to use the post-nominal letters MRPharmS (Member of the Royal Pharmaceutical Society) and to practise as pharmacist in Great Britain. Fellowships (FRPharmS) were also awarded for pharmacists with long standing and outstanding commitment to the profession.

Since 2010, the register of pharmacists is now held by the GPhC and it is this body which now controls registration and fitness to practise. The Royal Pharmaceutical Society now provides Members with the post-nominals 'MRPharmS', Associate members receive 'ARPharmS', pharmaceutical Scientist members awarded 'SRPharmS', and Fellows denoted by the 'FRPharmS' post-nominals.

History 
The Pharmaceutical Society of Great Britain was founded on 15 April 1841 by  William Allen FRS, Jacob Bell, Daniel Hanbury, John Bell, Andrew Ure, James Marwood Hucklebridge, and other London chemists and druggists, at a meeting in the Crown and Anchor Tavern, Strand, London.  William Allen was its first President, and the society quickly took premises at 17 Bloomsbury Square, London where a School of Pharmacy was established in which botany and materia medica were an important part of the students’ curriculum. In 1843, Queen Victoria granted the society its Royal Charter. In 1879 Rose Coombes Minshull (1845–1905) and Isabella Skinner Clarke (1842–1926) became the first two women elected as full members of the society. In 1918 Margaret Elizabeth Buchanan became the first woman to be elected to the Council of the society, serving until 1926. Jean Irvine became the first female president of the society in 1947, which position she held until 1948.

In 1981, the RPSGB Diploma course in Veterinary pharmacy was initiated by professionals such as Michael Jepson and Steven Kayne, the former of whom led what was to become an institution until he retired in 2004. Sarah Cockbill then took the responsibility.

In 1988, Queen Elizabeth II agreed that the title "Royal" should be granted to the society.

The RPSGB operated a publishing company and the Royal Pharmaceutical Society Museum, both of which are now operated by the Royal Pharmaceutical Society.

Arms

See also
Pharmaceutical industry in the United Kingdom
List of pharmacy organisations in the United Kingdom
List of schools of pharmacy in the United Kingdom
British National Formulary
British National Formulary for Children
The Pharmacy Practice Research Trust

References

External links
Official site

Health in the London Borough of Tower Hamlets
Medical and health regulators
1841 establishments in the United Kingdom
Organizations established in 1841
Pharmacy organisations in the United Kingdom
Regulators of the United Kingdom